Sharvin Muniandy (born 15 October 1995) is a Malaysian cricketer who plays for the Malaysia national cricket team. He made his Twenty20 International (T20I) debut for Malaysia against Thailand on 24 June 2019 in the 2019 Malaysia Tri-Nation Series. In July 2019, he was named in Malaysia's squad for the Regional Finals of the 2018–19 ICC T20 World Cup Asia Qualifier tournament. He played in Malaysia's opening fixture of the Regional Finals, against Kuwait, on 22 July 2019.

In July 2022, he was named in Malaysia's squad for the 2022 Canada Cricket World Cup Challenge League A tournament. He made his List A debut on 28 July 2022, for Malaysia against Vanuatu.

References

External links
 

1995 births
Living people
Malaysian cricketers
Malaysia Twenty20 International cricketers
Place of birth missing (living people)
Malaysian people of Tamil descent
Malaysian sportspeople of Indian descent